Statistics of Austrian league in the 1948–49 season.

Overview
It was contested by 10 teams, and FK Austria Wien won the championship.

League standings

Results

References
Austria - List of final tables (RSSSF)

Austrian Football Bundesliga seasons
Austria
1